Sausage bread is an American food made of sausage and other ingredients rolled or enclosed in dough and cooked in an oven.

Sausage bread is typically made from pizza dough and includes Italian sausage, mozzarella cheese (or a similar substitute cheese) and other ingredients such as mushrooms, onions, other vegetables, and various herbs, spices and sauces depending on the recipe.  If dough is used, the sausage is usually crumbled or cut, and is baked, along with the cheese inside a long piece of rolled pizza dough. Beth Hensperger's The Bread Bible recipe suggests putting the ingredients on a rectangle of dough and lengthwise jelly-roll-style to create a layered sausage bread.

Sausage bread has been modified into sausage bread pudding in an LA Times recipe.

See also
 Pepperoni roll
 Sausage roll
 Pigs in a blanket (American-style)
 Stromboli
 Pizza
 List of bread dishes
 List of sausage dishes
 List of stuffed dishes

References

Pizza in the United States
Sausage dishes
Pizza styles
Bread dishes
Stuffed dishes